The Framework Class Library (FCL) is a component of Microsoft's .NET Framework, the first implementation of the Common Language Infrastructure (CLI). In much the same way as Common Language Runtime (CLR) implements the CLI Virtual Execution System (VES), the FCL implements the CLI foundational Standard Libraries. As a CLI foundational class libraries implementation, it is a collection of reusable classes, interfaces, and value types, and includes an implementation of the CLI Base Class Library (BCL).

With Microsoft's move to .NET Core, the CLI foundational class libraries implementation is known as CoreFX instead of Framework Class Library.

See also 
Standard Libraries (CLI)
Base Class Library (BCL)

References

Difference Between .NET Core and .NET Framework: Head to Head Comparison

External links
.NET Framework Developer Center. Microsoft Developer Network (MSDN).
.NET Framework 3.5 namespaces

.NET Framework terminology
Microsoft application programming interfaces

ru:Framework Class Library